Farnam may refer to the following:

Places
 Farnam, Iran, a village in Markazi Province, Iran
 Farnam, Nebraska, a village in Dawson County
In Omaha, Nebraska, USA
 Farnam Building
 West Farnam Apartments
 West Farnam neighborhood
In Cheshire, Massachusetts, USA
 Farnams Village Historic District
In Oneida, New York, USA
 Farnam Mansion

People
 C. Eugene Farnam (1916–1999), American politician
 Farnam Jahanian, Carnegie Mellon University president
 Henry Farnam (1803–1883), American railroad executive
 Henry Walcott Farnam (1853–1933), American economist
 Louise Whitman Farnam (1890–1949), American physician
 Lynnwood Farnam (1885–1930), Canadian organist
 Ruth Stanley Farnam (1873–1956), American nurse, soldier and writer

See also
Farnham (disambiguation)
Farnum (disambiguation)
Marshall Farnam Hurd (1823–1903), American civil engineer and nephew of Henry Farnam